John Campbell of Lundy or Lundie (died 1562) was a Scottish lawyer and courtier.

He was a son of Thomas Campbell of Lundy, a son of Colin Campbell, 1st Earl of Argyll and Isabella Stewart, who was a daughter of John Stewart, Lord Lorne. The lands of Lundie are in Angus.

He was a founder member of the Scottish College of Justice, and treasurer for James V.

Campbell was Master of Household to Mary of Guise in 1546, when she lived at Stirling Castle with her daughter, Mary, Queen of Scots. Guise also stayed at Falkland Palace in this period in October 1546.

Campbell was Justice Depute in 1546 and held an "ayre" in Lanark. He went with Regent Arran and the Justice Clerk, John Bellenden of Auchnoule, to hold a justiciary court in Aberdeen in June and July 1552. They were entertained by the court musicians and a fool called Robertson, and Arran's cook Robert Bennet prepared their food.

He died in 1562.

Marriages and children
He married Isabel Gray, a daughter of Andrew, 2nd Lord Gray, and widow of James Scrimgeour of Dudhope and of Adam Crichton of Brunstane. His second wife was Agnes Home, widow of William Sinclair of Roslin.

His children included:
 John Campbell of Lundy, who married Janet Herring, sister of Andrew Herring of Glascune
 Margaret Campbell

References

External links
 'Campbell of Lundie', Red Book of Scotland

Court of Mary, Queen of Scots
Lord High Treasurers of Scotland
1562 deaths
16th-century Scottish people
Masters of the Scottish royal household